The 2009 Men's Australian Hockey League was the 19th edition of the men's field hockey tournament. The finals week of the tournament was held in the Tasmanian city of Hobart.

The WA Thundersticks won the gold medal for the eighth time by defeating the QLD Blades 2–1 in the final.

Competition format
The 2009 Men's Australian Hockey League consisted of a single round robin format, followed by classification matches. 

Teams from all 8 states and territories competed against one another throughout the pool stage in home and away matches. At the conclusion of the pool stage, the top four ranked teams progressed to the semi-finals, while the bottom four teams continued to the classification stage.

Point Allocation
All matches had an outright result, meaning drawn matches were decided in either golden goal extra time, or a penalty shoot-out. Match points were as follows:

· 3 points for a win
· 1 points to each team in the event of a draw
· 0 points to the loser of the match

Teams

  Canberra Lakers
  Southern Hotshots

  NSW Waratahs
  Tassie Tigers

  NT Stingers
  VIC Vikings

  QLD Blades
  WA Thundersticks

Results

Preliminary round

Fixtures

Classification round

Fifth to eighth place classification

Crossover

Seventh and eighth place

Fifth and sixth place

First to fourth place classification

Semi-finals

Third and fourth place

Final

Awards

Statistics

Final standings

Goalscorers

References

External links

2009
2005 in Australian field hockey